A mill is a device, often a structure, machine or kitchen appliance, that breaks solid materials into smaller pieces by grinding, crushing, or cutting. Such comminution is an important unit operation in many processes. There are many different types of mills and many types of materials processed in them. Historically mills were powered by hand or by animals (e.g., via a hand crank), working animal (e.g., horse mill), wind (windmill) or water (watermill). In modern era, they are usually powered by electricity.

The grinding of solid materials occurs through mechanical forces that break up the structure by overcoming the interior bonding forces. After the grinding the state of the solid is changed: the grain size, the grain size disposition and the grain shape.

Milling also refers to the process of breaking down, separating, sizing, or classifying aggregate material (e.g. mining ore).  For instance rock crushing or grinding to produce uniform aggregate size for construction purposes, or separation of rock, soil or aggregate material for the purposes of structural fill or land reclamation activities.  Aggregate milling processes are also used to remove or separate contamination or moisture from aggregate or soil and to produce "dry fills" prior to transport or structural filling.

Grinding may serve the following purposes in engineering:
increase of the surface area of a solid
manufacturing of a solid with a desired grain size
pulping of resources

Grinding laws
In spite of a great number of studies in the field of fracture schemes there is no formula known which connects the technical grinding work with grinding results. Mining engineers, Peter von Rittinger, Friedrich Kick and Fred Chester Bond independently developed equations relating produced equations to relate the needed grinding work to the grain size produced and a fourth engineer, R.T.Hukki suggested that these three equations might each describe a narrow range of grain sizes and proposed uniting them along a single curve describing what has come to be known as the Hukki relationship.

In stirred mills, the Hukki relationship does not apply and instead, experimentation has to be performed to determine any relationship.

To evaluate the grinding results the grain size disposition of the source material (1) and of the ground material (2) is needed. Grinding degree is the ratio of the sizes from the grain disposition. There are several definitions for this characteristic value:

Grinding degree referring to grain size d80

Instead of the value of d80 also d50 or other grain diameter can be used.

Grinding degree referring to specific surface

The specific surface area referring to volume Sv and the specific surface area referring to mass Sm can be found out through experiments.

Pretended grinding degree

The discharge die gap a of the grinding machine is used for the ground solid matter in this formula.

Grinding machines
In materials processing a grinder is a machine for producing fine particle size reduction through attrition and compressive forces at the grain size level. See also crusher for mechanisms producing larger particles. In general, grinding processes require a relatively large amount of energy; for this reason, an experimental method to measure the energy used locally during milling with different machines was recently proposed.

Autogenous mill
Autogenous or autogenic mills are so-called due to the self-grinding of the ore: a rotating drum throws larger rocks of ore in a cascading motion which causes impact breakage of larger rocks and compressive grinding of finer particles. It is similar in operation to a SAG mill as described below but does not use steel balls in the mill.  Also known as ROM or "Run Of Mine" grinding.

Ball mill
A typical type of fine grinder is the ball mill. A slightly inclined or horizontal rotating cylinder is partially filled with balls, usually stone or metal, which grind material to the necessary fineness by friction and impact with the tumbling balls. Ball mills normally operate with an approximate ball charge of 30%. Ball mills are characterized by their smaller (comparatively) diameter and longer length, and often have a length 1.5 to 2.5 times the diameter. The feed is at one end of the cylinder and the discharge is at the other. Ball mills are commonly used in the manufacture of Portland cement and finer grinding stages of mineral processing. Industrial ball mills can be as large as 8.5 m (28 ft) in diameter with a 22 MW motor, drawing approximately 0.0011% of the total world's power (see List of countries by electricity consumption). However, small versions of ball mills can be found in laboratories where they are used for grinding sample material for quality assurance.

The power predictions for ball mills typically use the following form of the Bond equation:

where
 E is the energy (kilowatt-hours per metric or short ton)
 W is the work index measured in a laboratory ball mill (kilowatt-hours per metric or short ton)
 P80 is the mill circuit product size in micrometers
 F80 is the mill circuit feed size in micrometers.

Buhrstone mill
Another type of fine grinder commonly used is the French buhrstone mill, which is similar to old-fashioned flour mills.

High pressure grinding rolls
A high pressure grinding roll, often referred to as HPGRs or roller press, consists out of two rollers with the same dimensions, which are rotating against each other with the same circumferential speed. The special feeding of bulk material through a hopper leads to a material bed between the two rollers. The bearing units of one roller can move linearly and are pressed against the material bed by springs or hydraulic cylinders. The pressures in the material bed are greater than 50 MPa (7,000 PSI). In general they achieve 100 to 300 MPa. By this the material bed is compacted to a solid volume portion of more than 80%.

The roller press has a certain similarity to roller crushers and roller presses for the compacting of powders, but purpose, construction and operation mode are different.

Extreme pressure causes the particles inside of the compacted material bed to fracture into finer particles and also causes microfracturing at the grain size level.  Compared to ball mills HPGRs achieve a 30 to 50% lower specific energy consumption, although they are not as common as ball mills since they are a newer technology.

A similar type of intermediate crusher is the edge runner, which consists of a circular pan with two or more heavy wheels known as mullers rotating within it; material to be crushed is shoved underneath the wheels using attached plow blades.

Pebble mill
A rotating drum causes friction and attrition between rock pebbles and ore particles. May be used where product contamination by iron from steel balls must be avoided. Quartz or silica is commonly used because it is inexpensive to obtain.

Rod mill
A rotating drum causes friction and attrition between steel rods and ore particles. But note that the term 'rod mill' is also used as a synonym for a slitting mill, which makes rods of iron or other metal.  Rod mills are less common than ball mills for grinding minerals.

The rods used in the mill, usually a high-carbon steel, can vary in both the length and the diameter. However, the smaller the rods, the larger is the total surface area and hence, the greater the grinding efficiency.

SAG mill
SAG is an acronym for semi-autogenous grinding. SAG mills are autogenous mills that also use grinding balls like a ball mill. A SAG mill is usually a primary or first stage grinder. SAG mills use a ball charge of 8 to 21%. The largest SAG mill is 42' (12.8m) in diameter, powered by a 28 MW (38,000 HP) motor. A SAG mill with a 44' (13.4m) diameter and a power of 35 MW (47,000 HP) has been designed.

Attrition between grinding balls and ore particles causes grinding of finer particles. SAG mills are characterized by their large diameter and short length as compared to ball mills. The inside of the mill is lined with lifting plates to lift the material inside the mill, where it then falls off the plates onto the rest of the ore charge. SAG mills are primarily used at gold, copper and platinum mines with applications also in the lead, zinc, silver, alumina and nickel industries.

Tower mill

Tower mills, often called vertical mills, stirred mills or regrind mills, are a more efficient means of grinding material at smaller particle sizes, and can be used after ball mills in a grinding process. Like ball mills, grinding (steel) balls or pebbles are often added to stirred mills to help grind ore, however these mills contain a large screw mounted vertically to lift and grind material.  In tower mills, there is no cascading action as in standard grinding mills.  Stirred mills are also common for mixing quicklime (CaO) into a lime slurry. There are several advantages to the tower mill: low noise, efficient energy usage, and low operating costs.

Vertical shaft impactor mill (VSI mill)

A VSI mill throws rock or ore particles against a wear plate by slinging them from a spinning center that rotates on a vertical shaft. This type of mill uses the same principle as a VSI crusher.

Types of grinding mills

 Windmill, wind powered
 Watermill, water powered
 Horse mill, animal powered
 Treadwheel, human powered (archaic: "treadmill")
 Ship mill, floats near a river bank or bridge
Arrastra, simple mill for grinding and pulverizing (typically) gold or silver ore.
 Roller mill, an equipment for the grinding or pulverizing of grain and other raw materials using cylinders
 Stamp mill, a specialized machine for reducing ore to powder for further processing or for fracturing other materials
 A place of business for making articles of manufacture.  The term mill was once in common use for a factory because many factories in the early stages of the Industrial Revolution were powered by a watermill, but nowadays it is only used in a few specific contexts; e.g.,
 Bark mill produces tanbark for tanneries
 Cider mill crushes apples to give cider
 Gristmill grinds grain into flour
 Oil mill, see expeller pressing, extrusion
 Paper mill produces paper
 Sawmill cuts timber
 Starch mill
 Steel mill manufactures steel
 Sugar mill (also called a sugar refinery) processes sugar beets or sugar cane into various finished products
 Textile mill
 Silk mill, for silk
 Flax mill, for flax
 Cotton mill, for cotton
 Huller (also called a rice mill, or rice husker) is used to hull rice
 Powder mill produces gunpowder

Ball mill
Bead mill
Coffee mill 
Colloid mill
Conical mill
Disintegrator
Disk mill
Edge mill
Gristmill, also called flour mill or corn mill
Hammermill
IsaMill
Jet mill
Mortar and pestle
Pellet mill
Planetary mill
Stirred mill
Three roll mill
Vibratory mill
VSI mill
Wiley mill

See also

Burr grinder
Coffee grinder
Expeller
Extruder
Herb grinder
Millstone
Rock crusher
IsaMill

References

External links

Video of fine grinder in mining application
Flour Mill Details
Image of SAG mill during installation
Grinding Media Grinding Media Guide

 
Mining equipment